Brodsky, feminine: Brodskaya (Ukrainian: Бродський, Russian: Бродский)  is a toponymic surname derived from Brody, a town in Ukraine.  The name is common among Ashkenazi Jews.
Czech-language forms are Brodský and Brodská.

Notable people with this surname include:
 Dani Brodskiq, Dani Boreca ot selo Brod, mnogo dobur borec
 Nina Brodskaya, Soviet singer
 Yulia Brodskaya, artist and illustrator
 Adam Brodsky, American Drummer / Musician
 Adolph Brodsky (1851–1929), Russian violinist and music teacher
 Alexander Brodsky, contemporary architect and artist
 Chuck Brodsky (born 1960), American musician
 Gabriel Wilfrid Stephen Brodsky (born 1933), Canadian literary research scholar, author
 Gail Brodsky (born 1991), American tennis player
 Hyman Brodsky (1852–1937), Russian-American rabbi
 Isaac Brodsky (1884–1939), Soviet painter
 Jascha Brodsky (1907–1997), Ukrainian-American violinist
 Joel Brodsky (1939–2007), photographer
 Joseph Brodsky (1940–1996), Russian poet and Nobel Prize winner
 Joseph Brodsky (lawyer), chief lawyer for the International Labor Defense
 Julian A. Brodsky (born 1933), American businessman
 Lazar Brodsky (1848–1904), Ukrainian businessman and philanthropist
 Louis Daniel Brodsky (born 1941), American poet
 Michael Brodsky (born 1948), American novelist and playwright
 Mykhaylo Brodskyy, (born 1959), Ukrainian politician and businessman
 Richard Brodsky (1946-2020), American politician and lawyer
 Sol Brodsky (1923–1984), American comic book artist and head of production of Marvel Comics
 Stanley Brodsky (born 1940), American physicist
 Stephen Brodsky, lead singer and guitar player for alternative metal band Cave In
 Vadim Brodsky (born 1950), Ukrainian-Polish violinist
 Vsevolod Brodsky (1909–1981), Russian-Soviet painter and illustrator, Editor-in-Chief of Molodaya Gvardiya (Young Guard) publishing house
 Vlastimil Brodský (1920–2002), Czech actor
 Tereza Brodská (born 1968), Czech actress
 , Czech actor, singer, and songwriter

Fictional Characters 
 Jacob Broadsky, a villain in the television show Bones
 Walker Brodsky, a young artist and love interest from Disney Channel series Andi Mack

See also
 
 Brodsky Quartet
 Brodzki

Ukrainian-language surnames
Czech-language surnames
Russian-language surnames
Toponymic surnames